Cora  Gooseberry (also known as Queen Gooseberry and Lady Bongary;  1777 – 30 July 1852) was an Aboriginal Australian Murro-ore-dial woman and cultural knowledge keeper. In popular culture, she is often depicted smoking a pipe and wearing a scarf on her head. She received two breastplates, one of which was inscribed "Cora Gooseberry/ Freeman/ Bungaree / Queen of Sydney and Botany". It is held by the Mitchell Library.

Early life
Cora Gooseberry was born Matora Gooseberry, her given Aboriginal Australian name, circa 1777.

Personal life
Cora Gooseberry was the daughter of Moorooboora (also known as Maroubra; circa 1758 to 1798), clan leader of the Murro-ore-dial (Pathway Place). Her husband was King Bungaree. She became widowed after Bungaree's death in 1830.

Death
On 30 July 1852, Cora Gooseberry was found dead at the Sydney Arms Hotel in Castlereagh Street, Sydney, New South Wales, Australia. According to her coroner's verdict, she had died of natural causes. She was buried in the Presbyterian section of the Sandhills cemetery, but her tombstone was relocated shortly after. It is now located in Pioneers Cemetery, Botany.

Notes

References

External links
 

1770s births
1852 deaths
Year of birth uncertain
Indigenous Australian people
Burials in New South Wales
19th-century Australian people
18th-century Australian women
19th-century Australian women